Bearskin Creek is a  long 3rd order tributary to the Banister River in Pittsylvania County, Virginia.

Course 
Bearskin Creek rises in a pond about 0.5 miles south of Green Pond, Virginia and then flows south-southeast to join the Banister River about 0.5 miles northeast of Jones Mill.

Watershed 
Bearskin Creek drains  of area, receives about 45.9 in/year of precipitation, has a wetness index of 446.94, and is about 45% forested.

See also 
 List of Virginia Rivers

References 

Rivers of Virginia
Rivers of Pittsylvania County, Virginia
Tributaries of the Roanoke River